Lukas Fadinger (born 27 September 2000) is an Austrian professional footballer who plays as a centre-back for Austrian Bundesliga club TSV Hartberg.

Career

Sturm Graz
On 11 June 2019 SK Sturm Graz announced, that Fadinger had been loaned out to SV Lafnitz for the 2019–20 season.

TSV Hartberg
On 11 September 2020 he signed with TSV Hartberg.

References

External links
Lukas Fadinger at ÖFB

2000 births
Living people
Austrian footballers
Austria youth international footballers
Austria under-21 international footballers
Association football midfielders
SK Sturm Graz players
SV Lafnitz players
TSV Hartberg players
Austrian Football Bundesliga players
2. Liga (Austria) players
Austrian Regionalliga players